Pea Ridge is the name of several places in the United States of America that include:

 Pea Ridge, Escambia County, Alabama 
 Pea Ridge, Fayette County, Alabama
 Pea Ridge, Marion County, Alabama
 Pea Ridge, Shelby County, Alabama
 Pea Ridge, Arkansas, in Benton County 
 Battle of Pea Ridge, an American Civil War battle
 Pea Ridge National Military Park
 Pea Ridge, Desha County, Arkansas
Pea Ridge, Florida
 Pea Ridge, Maine 
 Pea Ridge, Missouri 
 Pea Ridge, North Carolina, in Washington County
 Pea Ridge, Polk County, North Carolina
 Pea Ridge, West Virginia